Abdullah Al-Dossari may refer to:
 Abdullah Al-Dossari (footballer, born 1983), Saudi Arabian footballer
 Abdullah Al-Dossari (footballer, born 1993), Saudi Arabian footballer